Qaleh-ye Asadabad (also Romanized as Qal’eh-ye As’adabad and Qal‘eh-ye As‘adābād; also known as As‘adābād and Asdābād) is a village in Deh Chal Rural District, in the Central District of Khondab County, Markazi Province, Iran. At the 2006 census, its population was 67, in 18 families.

References 

Populated places in Khondab County